The Simca-Gordini T11, also known simply as the Gordini Type 11, is an open-wheel race car, designed, developed, and built by French manufacturer Gordini, to compete in Formula One, and was produced between 1946 and 1953.

References

Open wheel racing cars
Formula One cars
1940s cars
1950s cars
Cars of France